Jeremy Stephens (born May 26, 1986) is an American professional mixed martial artist who competes in the Lightweight division. A professional since 2005, he spent 15 years and competed in 33 bouts in the UFC's Featherweight and Lightweight divisions and also spent time in the Professional Fighters League (PFL).

Background
Stephens was born in Des Moines, Iowa, on May 26, 1986, and came from a broken home. When he was eight years old, Stephens parents divorced and he constantly switched between schools while also living in various apartments, shelters, and even in his mother's car before moving to Norwalk, Iowa with his father, who was granted custody of Stephens when he was in the fifth grade. Growing up, Stephens played baseball, basketball, and also competed in wrestling. Stephens attended Norwalk High School where he was a standout in baseball and wrestling, having returned to wrestling during his senior year. Stephens was introduced to mixed martial arts by his grandfather who had also originally persuaded Stephens to compete in wrestling. While beginning his career in mixed martial arts, Stephens looked up to and later became friends with fellow Des Moines native Josh Neer.

Mixed martial arts career

Early career
At age 16, Stephens began mixed martial arts as an amateur and began full-time training at the age of 18. Stephens was the UGC and MCC Lightweight Champion.

Ultimate Fighting Championship

2007
Stephens was defeated via second round armbar submission in his UFC debut against veteran Din Thomas at UFC 71 on May 26, 2007.

His first win in the UFC was against Diego Saraiva at UFC 76 via unanimous decision.

2008
Jeremy then scored his second win inside the Octagon after beating Cole Miller via second-round TKO at UFC Fight Night 12.

At the finale of The Ultimate Fighter 7, Jeremy took on former trainer and friend Spencer Fisher. Stephens lost via unanimous decision.

After the loss he rebounded with an emphatic come from behind knockout victory over BJJ black belt and future UFC Lightweight Champion, Rafael dos Anjos at UFC 91. He was out-grappled the first two rounds but in the third came out swinging and landed a huge uppercut on dos Anjos that knocked him unconscious. This win earned him the Knockout of the Night award.

2009
Stephens next stepped in as a late replacement for Hermes Franca against Joe Lauzon on February 7, 2009 at UFC Fight Night 17. Lauzon defeated Stephens with an armbar late in the second round.

Then on April 1, 2009 at UFC Fight Night: Condit vs Kampmann, Stephens was out-wrestled by Gleison Tibau and lost his second straight fight via unanimous decision.

Stephens was expected to return to the octagon on September 16, 2009, at UFC Fight Night: Diaz vs. Guillard against UFC newcomer Ronnys Torres. However, Torres sustained an injury during training and was replaced by Justin Buchholz. Stephens defeated Buchholz after landing several big strikes and opening up a deep gash on Buchholz's forehead, forcing the doctor to stop the fight midway through the first round. This win earned him the Knockout of the Night award.

2010
Stephens was expected to face Nik Lentz on January 11, 2010, at UFC Fight Night 20. However, Stephens suffered a cut and was forced to pull out of the fight.

Stephens defeated Sam Stout via split decision on May 8, 2010, at UFC 113. He won the fight via split decision. This win earned him the Fight of the Night award.

Stephens lost to Melvin Guillard on September 25, 2010, at UFC 119 via split decision.

2011
Stephens faced Marcus Davis on January 1, 2011, at UFC 125. After likely losing the first two rounds, Stephens then came out more aggressive in the third round and caught Davis with a counter punch resulting in a KO win. This win earned him the Knockout of the Night award.

Stephens was expected to face Jonathan Brookins on June 4, 2011, at The Ultimate Fighter 13 Finale. However, Brookins was forced from the bout with an injury and replaced by Danny Downes. Stephens defeated Downes via unanimous decision after dominating all three rounds.

Stephens faced Anthony Pettis on October 8, 2011, at UFC 136. Pettis defeated Stephens via split decision (29-28, 28–29, 29-28).

2012
Stephens replaced an injured Yves Edwards against Donald Cerrone on May 15, 2012 at UFC on Fuel TV: Korean Zombie vs. Poirier He lost the fight via unanimous decision.

Stephens was expected to face Yves Edwards on October 5, 2012, at UFC on FX 5. However, the bout was cancelled due to Stephens being arrested on the day of the event for an assault charge that dates back to 2011. The fight eventually took place on December 8, 2012 at UFC on Fox 5. Edwards won by knockout in the first round, being the first fighter to ever stop Stephens via strikes.

2013
Stephens made his Featherweight debut against promotional newcomer Estevan Payan on May 25, 2013 at UFC 160. He won the bloody fight via unanimous decision.

Stephens was expected to face Rony Jason on October 9, 2013, at UFC Fight Night 29. However, Jason pulled out of the bout citing an injury (lumbar hernia). The bout eventually took place on November 9, 2013, at UFC Fight Night 32. Stephens won via knockout early in the first round.

2014
Stephens faced Darren Elkins on January 25, 2014, at UFC on Fox 10. He won the fight via unanimous decision.

Stephens faced Cub Swanson on June 28, 2014, at UFC Fight Night 44. He lost the fight via unanimous decision. This fight earned him the Fight of the Night award.

Stephens next faced Charles Oliveira on December 12, 2014, at The Ultimate Fighter 20 Finale. He lost the fight by unanimous decision.

2015
Stephens faced Dennis Bermudez on July 11, 2015, at UFC 189. He won the fight by TKO due to a flying knee and punches after a close first two rounds.

Stephens faced Max Holloway on December 12, 2015, at UFC 194. He lost the fight via unanimous decision.

2016
Stephens faced former UFC Bantamweight Champion Renan Barão on May 29, 2016, at UFC Fight Night 88. He won the back and forth bout by unanimous decision. Both participants were awarded Fight of the Night honors for their performance.

Stephens faced former UFC Lightweight Champion Frankie Edgar on November 12, 2016, at UFC 205. He lost the fight via unanimous decision.

2017
Stephens faced Renato Moicano on April 15, 2017, at UFC on Fox 24. He lost the fight by split decision.

Stephens faced Gilbert Melendez on September 9, 2017, at UFC 215. He won the fight via unanimous decision. Both participants were awarded Fight of the Night honors for their performance.

2018
Stephens faced Doo Ho Choi on January 14, 2018, at UFC Fight Night: Stephens vs. Choi. He won the fight via TKO in the second round. Both participants were awarded Fight of the Night.

Stephens faced Josh Emmett on February 24, 2018 at UFC on Fox 28. He won the fight via knockout in round two. This win earned him a Performance of the Night bonus.

Stephens next faced former WEC Featherweight Champion and 2-time UFC Featherweight Champion José Aldo, on July 28, 2018 at UFC on Fox: Alvarez vs. Poirier 2. He lost the fight via TKO in the first round.

2019
Stephens faced Zabit Magomedsharipov on March 2, 2019 at UFC 235. He lost the fight via unanimous decision.

Stephens faced Yair Rodríguez on September 21, 2019 in the main event at UFC on ESPN+ 17.  The bout ended in a "No Contest" just 15 seconds into the first round after Rodríguez accidentally swatted Stephens in the left eye, rendering Stephens unable to continue.

Stephens faced Yair Rodríguez in a rematch on October 18, 2019 at UFC on ESPN 6. He lost the fight via unanimous decision. This fight earned him the Fight of the Night award.

2020
Stephens was scheduled to Calvin Kattar on April 18, 2020 at UFC 249. However, on April 9, Dana White, the president of UFC announced that this event was postponed and the bout eventually took place on May 9, 2020. At the weigh-ins on May 8, Stephens missed weight, weighing in at 150.5 pounds, 4.5 pounds over the non-title featherweight limit. As a result, the bout proceeded as a catchweight bout and Stephens was fined 20% of his purse. Despite having success and out-striking Kattar in the first round, Stephens lost the fight via technical knockout in round two.

Stephens was scheduled to face Arnold Allen on November 7, 2020 at UFC on ESPN: Santos vs. Teixeira. However, Stephens was forced to withdraw from the event, citing injury.

2021
Stephens was expected to return to the lightweight division for the first one since 2012 to face Drakkar Klose at UFC on ESPN 22. However, day of the event, it was announced that the bout was scrapped due to Klose sustaining a spinal injury as a result of being shoved by Stephens at the weigh-ins.

Stephens faced Mateusz Gamrot on July 17, 2021 at UFC on ESPN: Makhachev vs. Moisés.  He lost the fight via submission in round one.

2022
In late-January 2022, it was announced that after a nearly 15 year tenure and 33 fights in the UFC, Stephens contract was not renewed after his most recent fight for the promotion.

Professional Fighters League 
After his contract was not renewed by the UFC, Stephens signed with PFL for the 2022 season to compete in their Lightweight division.

In his promotional debut, Stephens faced Clay Collard on April 23, 2022 at PFL 1. In a back and forth affair, Stephens lost the bout via unanimous decision.

Stephens faced Myles Price on June 17, 2022 at PFL 4. He won the bout via split decision.

Stephens faced Natan Schulte on November 25, 2022 at PFL 10. Stephens lost the bout in the second round, getting submitted by arm-triangle choke.

Personal life
Stephens is of Mexican descent maternally. He has two daughters and is a good friend of former UFC Fighter Anton Kuivanen. Stephens has spoken about how self-doubt has affected his life and how his failures have led to suicidal thoughts in the past.

On October 5, 2012, the date Stephens was supposed to fight at UFC on FX: Browne vs. Bigfoot, Stephens was arrested in Minneapolis, Minnesota after Minneapolis PD served an arrest warrant. Stephens was charged with felony assault and burglary, stemming from an incident that took place in Des Moines, Iowa in 2011. Stephens was then extradited to the Polk County jail where he was incarcerated for 15 days before being released. Most of the charges, however, were eventually dropped, and Stephens pleaded guilty to one count of disorderly conduct, a misdemeanor.

Championships and accomplishments 
 Ultimate Fighting Championship
 Knockout of the Night (Three times) 
 Fight of the Night (Six times) 
Performance of the Night (One time)  vs. Josh Emmett
Tied (Anderson Silva) for second-most knockdowns in UFC history (18)
MMAJunkie.com
2014 June Fight of the Month vs. Cub Swanson
2019 October Fight of the Month vs. Yair Rodríguez

Mixed martial arts record

|-
|Loss
|align=center|29–21 (1)
|Natan Schulte
|Submission (arm-triangle choke)
|PFL 10
|
|align=center|2
|align=center|1:32
|New York City, New York, United States
|
|-
|Win
|align=center|29–20 (1)
|Myles Price
|Decision (split)
|PFL 4
|
|align=center|3
|align=center|5:00
|Atlanta, Georgia, United States
|
|-
|Loss
|align=center|28–20 (1)
|Clay Collard
|Decision (unanimous)
|PFL 1
|
|align=center|3
|align=center|5:00
|Arlington, Texas, United States
|
|-
|Loss
|align=center|28–19 (1)
|Mateusz Gamrot
|Submission (kimura)
|UFC on ESPN: Makhachev vs. Moisés
|
|align=center|1
|align=center|1:05
|Las Vegas, Nevada, United States
|
|-
|Loss
|align=center|28–18 (1)
|Calvin Kattar
|KO (elbows)
|UFC 249
|
|align=center|2
|align=center|2:42
|Jacksonville, Florida, United States
|
|-
|Loss
|align=center|28–17 (1)
|Yair Rodríguez
|Decision (unanimous)
|UFC on ESPN: Reyes vs. Weidman 
|
|align=center|3
|align=center|5:00
|Boston, Massachusetts, United States
|
|-
|NC
|align=center|28–16 (1)
|Yair Rodríguez
|NC (accidental eye poke) 
|UFC Fight Night: Rodríguez vs. Stephens 
|
|align=center|1
|align=center|0:15
|Mexico City, Mexico
|
|-
|Loss
|align=center|28–16
|Zabit Magomedsharipov
|Decision (unanimous)
|UFC 235 
|
|align=center|3
|align=center|5:00
|Las Vegas, Nevada, United States
|
|-
|Loss
|align=center|28–15
|José Aldo
|TKO (punches)
|UFC on Fox: Alvarez vs. Poirier 2 
|
|align=center|1
|align=center|4:19
|Calgary, Alberta, Canada
|  
|-
|Win
|align=center|28–14
|Josh Emmett
|KO (elbows)
|UFC on Fox: Emmett vs. Stephens
|
|align=center|2
|align=center|1:35
|Orlando, Florida, United States
|
|-
|Win
|align=center|27–14
|Choi Doo-ho
|TKO (punches and elbows)
|UFC Fight Night: Stephens vs. Choi
|
|align=center|2
|align=center|2:36
|St. Louis, Missouri, United States
|
|-
|Win
|align=center|26–14
|Gilbert Melendez
|Decision (unanimous)
|UFC 215 
|
|align=center|3
|align=center|5:00
|Edmonton, Alberta, Canada
|
|-
|Loss
|align=center|25–14
|Renato Moicano
|Decision (split)
|UFC on Fox: Johnson vs. Reis
|
|align=center|3
|align=center|5:00
|Kansas City, Missouri, United States
|
|-
|Loss
|align=center|25–13
|Frankie Edgar
|Decision (unanimous)
|UFC 205
|
|align=center|3
|align=center|5:00
|New York City, New York, United States
|
|-
|Win
|align=center|25–12
|Renan Barão
|Decision (unanimous)
|UFC Fight Night: Almeida vs. Garbrandt
|
|align=center|3
|align=center|5:00
|Las Vegas, Nevada, United States
|
|-
|Loss
|align=center|24–12
|Max Holloway
|Decision (unanimous)
|UFC 194
|
|align=center|3
|align=center|5:00
|Las Vegas, Nevada, United States
|
|-
|Win
|align=center|24–11
|Dennis Bermudez
|TKO (flying knee and punches)
|UFC 189 
|
|align=center|3
|align=center|0:32
|Las Vegas, Nevada, United States
|
|-
|Loss
|align=center| 23–11 
|Charles Oliveira
|Decision (unanimous)
|The Ultimate Fighter: A Champion Will Be Crowned Finale
|
|align=center|3
|align=center|5:00
|Las Vegas, Nevada, United States
|
|-
|Loss
|align=center| 23–10 
|Cub Swanson
|Decision (unanimous)
|UFC Fight Night: Swanson vs. Stephens
|
|align=center|5
|align=center|5:00
|San Antonio, Texas, United States
|
|-
|Win
|align=center| 23–9
|Darren Elkins
|Decision (unanimous)
|UFC on Fox: Henderson vs. Thomson
|
|align=center|3
|align=center|5:00
|Chicago, Illinois, United States
|
|-
|Win
|align=center| 22–9
|Rony Jason
|KO (head kick)
|UFC Fight Night: Belfort vs. Henderson 2
|
|align=center|1
|align=center|0:40
|Goiânia, Brazil
|
|-
|Win
|align=center|21–9
|Estevan Payan
|Decision (unanimous)
|UFC 160
|
|align=center|3
|align=center|5:00
|Las Vegas, Nevada, United States
|
|-
|Loss
|align=center|20–9
|Yves Edwards
|KO (punches and elbows)
|UFC on Fox: Henderson vs. Diaz
|
|align=center|1
|align=center|1:55
|Seattle, Washington, United States
| 
|-
|Loss
|align=center|20–8
|Donald Cerrone
|Decision (unanimous)
|UFC on Fuel TV: The Korean Zombie vs. Poirier
|
|align=center|3
|align=center|5:00
|Fairfax, Virginia, United States
| 
|-
|Loss
|align=center|20–7
|Anthony Pettis
|Decision (split)
|UFC 136
|
|align=center|3
|align=center|5:00
|Houston, Texas, United States
| 
|-
|Win
|align=center|20–6
|Danny Downes
|Decision (unanimous)
|The Ultimate Fighter: Team Lesnar vs. Team dos Santos Finale
|
|align=center|3
|align=center|5:00
|Las Vegas, Nevada, United States
|
|-
|Win
|align=center|19–6
|Marcus Davis
|KO (punch)
|UFC 125
|
|align=center|3
|align=center|2:33
|Las Vegas, Nevada, United States
|
|-
|Loss
|align=center|18–6
|Melvin Guillard
|Decision (split)
|UFC 119
|
|align=center|3
|align=center|5:00
|Indianapolis, Indiana, United States
|
|-
|Win
|align=center|18–5
|Sam Stout
|Decision (split)
|UFC 113
|
|align=center|3
|align=center|5:00
|Montreal, Quebec, Canada
|
|-
|Win
|align=center|17–5
|Justin Buchholz
|TKO (doctor stoppage)
|UFC Fight Night: Diaz vs. Guillard
|
|align=center|1
|align=center|3:32
|Oklahoma City, Oklahoma, United States
|
|-
|Loss
|align=center|16–5
|Gleison Tibau
|Decision (unanimous)
|UFC Fight Night: Condit vs. Kampmann
|
|align=center|3
|align=center|5:00
|Nashville, Tennessee, United States
|
|-
|Loss
|align=center|16–4
|Joe Lauzon
|Submission (armbar)
|UFC Fight Night: Lauzon vs. Stephens
|
|align=center|2
|align=center|4:43
|Tampa, Florida, United States
|
|-
|Win
|align=center|16–3
|Rafael dos Anjos
|KO (punches)
|UFC 91
|
|align=center|3
|align=center|0:39
|Las Vegas, Nevada, United States
|
|-
|Loss
|align=center|15–3
|Spencer Fisher
|Decision (unanimous)
|The Ultimate Fighter: Team Rampage vs. Team Forrest Finale
|
|align=center|3
|align=center|5:00
|Las Vegas, Nevada, United States
|
|-
|Win
|align=center|15–2
|Cole Miller
| TKO (punches and elbows)
| UFC Fight Night: Swick vs. Burkman
|
|align=center|2
|align=center|4:44
|Las Vegas, Nevada, United States
|
|-
|Win
|align=center|14–2
|Diego Saraiva
|Decision (unanimous)
|UFC 76
|
|align=center|3
|align=center|5:00
|Anaheim, California, United States
|
|-
|Win
|align=center|13–2
|Nick Walker
|TKO (punches)
|MCC 9: Heatwave
|
|align=center|1
|align=center|4:45
|Des Moines, Iowa, United States
|
|-
|Loss
|align=center|12–2
|Din Thomas
|Submission (armbar)
|UFC 71
|
|align=center|2
|align=center|2:44
|Las Vegas, Nevada, United States
|
|-
|Win
|align=center|12–1
|Vern Jefferson
| TKO (punches)
|Greensparks: Full Contact Fighting 3
|
|align=center|1
|align=center|3:58
|Des Moines, Iowa, United States
|
|-
|Win
|align=center|11–1
|Norm Alexander
| Submission (triangle choke)
| TFC: Battle at the Barn
|
|align=center|1
|align=center|3:26
|Des Moines, Iowa, United States
|
|-
|Win
|align=center|10–1
|Chris Mickle
| KO (punch)
|MCC 5: Thanksgiving Throwdown
|
|align=center|4
|align=center|0:27
|Des Moines, Iowa, United States
|
|-
|Win
|align=center|9–1
|Aaron Williams
| TKO (punches)
|Universal Gladiator Championships 4
|
|align=center|1
|align=center|N/A
|Kenner, Louisiana, United States
|
|-
|Win
|align=center|8–1
|Doug Alcorn
| Submission (armbar)
|Greensparks: Full Contact Fighting 1
|
|align=center|1
|align=center|1:56
|Clive, Iowa, United States
|
|-
|Win
|align=center|7–1
|Chris Mickle
| TKO (punches)
| MCC 4: The Rematch
|
|align=center|2
|align=center|3:36
|Des Moines, Iowa, United States
|
|-
|Win
|align=center|6–1
|Kendrick Johnson
| KO (punch)
| Midwest Cage Championships 1
|
|align=center|1
|align=center|1:46
|Des Moines, Iowa, United States
|
|-
|Win
|align=center|5–1
|Will Shutt
| TKO (punches)
| XKK: Trials
|
|align=center|1
|align=center|1:19
|Des Moines, Iowa, United States
|
|-
|Win
|align=center|4–1
|Sharome Blanchard
|TKO (punches)
| XKK: Des Moines
|
|align=center|1
|align=center|2:36
|Des Moines, Iowa, United States
|
|-
|Loss
|align=center|3–1
|Chris Mickle
| Submission (rear-naked choke)
| Downtown Destruction 3
|
|align=center|2
|align=center|1:51
|Des Moines, Iowa, United States
|
|-
|Win
|align=center|3–0
|Chris Caleb
| KO (punch)
| Downtown Destruction 2
|
|align=center|1
|align=center|1:44
|Owatonna, Minnesota, United States
|
|-
|Win
|align=center|2–0
|Gary Percival
| TKO (submission to punches)
| Jungle Madness 2
|
|align=center|1
|align=center|N/A
|Des Moines, Iowa, United States
|
|-
|Win
|align=center|1–0
|Ted Worthington
| KO (punches)
| Downtown Destruction 1
|
|align=center|1
|align=center|0:33
|Des Moines, Iowa, United States
|
|-

Boxing record

See also
 List of male mixed martial artists

References

External links
 

American male mixed martial artists
Mixed martial artists from Iowa
Mixed martial artists utilizing wrestling
Mixed martial artists utilizing Brazilian jiu-jitsu
American mixed martial artists of Mexican descent
Living people
1986 births
Sportspeople from Des Moines, Iowa
People from Polk County, Iowa
American male sport wrestlers
Amateur wrestlers
American practitioners of Brazilian jiu-jitsu
Ultimate Fighting Championship male fighters